Seyuki (also Romanized as Seyūkī, Sīūkī, and Sīyūkī) is a village in Pain Velayat Rural District, in the Central District of Torbat-e Heydarieh County, Razavi Khorasan Province, Iran. At the 2006 census, its population was 1,135, in 326 families.

References 

Populated places in Torbat-e Heydarieh County